Jänes is an Estonian surname (meaning "hare"), and may refer to:
Kärt Jänes-Kapp (1960–2015), journalist and editor
Laine Jänes (now Laine Randjärv; born 1964), politician
Peep Jänes (born 1936), architect

See also
Janes (disambiguation)

References

Estonian-language surnames
Surnames from nicknames